Banned in Boston is a compilation CD by American punk rock musician GG Allin, released by Black & Blue Records. Although it was compiled and sent to the manufacturing plant in the winter of 1988 and gives a copyright date of that year, it was released in 1989. It was also the first GG Allin title to be released on compact disc. The release on CD included additional material not on the vinyl version Black & Blue Records released.

The CD was compiled by Black and Blue Records owner Peter Yarmouth with cooperation from GG Allin, since the two previous 7" releases had started to garner interest after the infamous Cat Club show in NYC and all the press in Village Voice, Flipside and other punk rock fanzines. The other version of the album is a compilation of all of GG Allin recordings with the Jabbers.

Recording 
At the time, Allin's notoriety was already established at a fast pace due to his continued outrageous stage antics throughout the United States.

Looking to both stretch out the material he had for the first-ever GG Allin CD (due to the CD format holding 70 minutes of material Yarmouth wanted to give fans a good bang for the buck) and attract collectors of Allin's work to a compilation of previously released material, Yarmouth took the initiative and came up with a professional-sounding recording of Allin and his first band, the Jabbers, playing what was a "full set" of material at the Boston nightclub The Channel. The last time they played The Channel the set lasted three songs with one of the "Goon Squad", Mick Horgun, dragging GG off the stage and kicking him in the head till security pulled him off Allin.  Yarmouth cleared things up with security pointing out that the perpetrator was on the guest list and part of the show (the bouncers were not amused). The Channel never booked Allin again after that show.

The show featured on the CD along with the interview pre and post show were all from the same night - September 9, 1981. Rather than add track marks to the beginning of every song Yarmouth incorporated all seven live recordings as one 15-minute-plus track on the CD (excluding two cover songs, The Stooges' "I Wanna Be Your Dog" and the New York Dolls' arrangement of Bo Diddley's "Pills", both of which remain unreleased), and framed this track with pre-and-post-show interviews with GG and the band. The interviewer was DJ Uncle Pete Davis, who committed suicide a few years later. Another interview note is that one of the people answering questions was a fan/roadie, not a member of the Jabbers.

For the previously released material on the CD, Yarmouth presented most of Allin's first album Always Was, Is And Always Shall Be (with the exception of "1980's Rock and Roll", which Allin insisted not be included on the CD because he hated the song and felt it was his worst song ever), as well as the single "Gimme Some Head" and the EPs Live Fast Die Fast, No Rules and You Hate Me and I Hate You.  Of these recordings, only Always Is... "No Rules" and You Hate Me... are actually by GG and the Jabbers. Live Fast Die Fast was done by Allin and a few of the now defunct Jabbers along with the drummer from a local hair-metal band called the Flying 69, while "Gimme Some Head" was Allin's already legendary collaboration with former MC5 members Wayne Kramer and Dennis Thompson along with members of the Jabbers.

In a bit of revisionist history, Yarmouth and Allin credited production on all of the recordings to "Dick Urine", the fictitious production credit from GG's early post-Jabbers cassette self-releases that later became the collective pseudonym for Allin and Yarmouth when Eat My Fuc was recorded and released, and claimed on the back cover of the CD, in a parody of standard early compact disc technical notes, "We haven't tried very hard to improve the sound." In reality, the sound was improved when the compiled CD was mastered at Bernie Grundman's mastering facilities, but it sounded punk to say that it wasn't. While many might question Yarmouth spending money on such poor source material, the audio quality of the CD was optimized.

This compilation would see re-release in a couple of different variations over the years.  In 1993, the entire CD was released with a different front cover (from photos Yarmouth took in 1983 and later of Allin) under the extended title Insult & Injury Volume 1 - 1977-1982 Banned in Boston, and the contents of same would also be split into two different CDs in 1998 as Banned in Boston, Volume 1 and Volume 2, with Volume 1 containing the studio recordings and Volume 2 featuring the live tracks and interviews. These versions are still available from Black & Blue Records today. In 1990, a new version was made with the Jabbers. This version of the album has a different track Listing and is only 37:18.

Track listing
Dead or Alive
Interview (September 9, 1981)
Live Boston (September 9, 1981)
You Hate Me and I Hate You
Gimme Some Head
Don't Talk to Me
Automatic
Nuke Attack
Bored to Death
Assface
Interview (September 9, 1981)
Live Fast Die Fast
Livin' Like an Animal
Loudenbomber
I Need Adventure
NYC Tonite
No Rules
A Fuckup
Gimme Some Head
You Hate Me and I Hate You
Bored to Death
Beat Beat Beat
One Man Army
Assface
Cheri Love Affair
Automatic
I Need Adventure (1980 Version)
Don't Talk to Me
Unpredictable
Radio Interview (unlisted on the CD tray liner)

Alternate Track listing
You Hate Me and I Hate You
Fuckup
No Rules
Bored To Death
Beat Beat Beat
One Man Army
Assface
Cheri Love Affair
Automatic
I Need Adventure
Don't Talk To Me
Unpredictable
Up Against The Wall
Gimmie Some Head
NYC Tonight
Dead Or Alive
Living Like an Animal

References

GG Allin albums
1989 compilation albums
Black & Blue Records compilation albums